Nawabganj National Park (locally known as Panchabati Forest) is IUCN Category IV national park and nature reserve in Bangladesh. The park is located about one kilometer northwest of Nawabganj Upazila Sadar under Dinajpur District. 

It consists of Jagannathpur, Harilakhur, Bara Jalalpur, Alokdhuti, Tarpanghat, Rasulpur and Khatkhatia Kristapur area of Nawabganj forest. The dominant floras of Nawabganj National Park are shorea robusta and teak. There are also gmelina arborea, eucalyptus regnans, syzygium cumini, acacia auriculiformis and few types of orchidaceae. Wild animals include wildcats, Bengal foxs, fishing cats and snakes.

The park was officially declared as a national park by the government of Bangladesh on 24 October 2010 for the purpose of conservation of flora, fauna, nature and development of tourism facilities. It covers an area of 517.61 hectares.

References

National parks of Bangladesh
Dinajpur District, Bangladesh
Protected areas established in 2010
2010 establishments in Bangladesh
Forests of Bangladesh